Solar power in Texas, a portion of total energy in Texas, includes utility-scale solar power plants as well as local distributed generation, mostly from rooftop photovoltaics. The western portion of the state especially has abundant open land areas, with some of the greatest solar and wind potential in the country.  Development activities there are also encouraged by relatively simple permitting and significant available transmission capacity.

Solar farms

The capacity of large solar farms in Texas has increased substantially in recent years. Facilities sized between 5 and 50 MW began to come online throughout the state between about 2010 and 2015.    Since then, progressively larger farms have been constructed in the western counties,  with the electricity being contracted by utilities which serve the more populated central and eastern regions.   The three largest operating facilities as of 2018 are the 180 MW Upton farm in Upton County, and the 157 MW Roserock and 154 MW Buckthorn farms in Pecos County.    Smaller installations by individuals, cooperatives, and businesses are also continuing to add significant capacity,  with some of top contractors in the state including  Meridian Solar, Longhorn Solar, Axium Solar and Native.

Statistic

Installed capacity

Generation

Utility-scale
Using data available from the U.S. Energy Information Agency's Electric Power Annual 2017 and "Electric Power Monthly Data Browser", the following tables summarize Texas's solar energy posture.

Capacity factor for each year was computed from the end-of-year summer capacity.

2018 data is from Electric Power Monthly and is subject to change.

Distributed
Beginning with the 2014 data year, the Energy Information Administration (EIA) has estimated the distributed solar generation and distributed solar capacity. These non-utility-scale appraisals evaluate that Texas generated the following amounts of additional solar energy:

Potential
Covering half of the roof with 10% efficient photovoltaics is sufficient to generate all of the electricity used by an average family in Texas. Solar farms are more cost effective in West Texas, where insolation levels are greater. This number is expected to be reduced by 50% by 2050, due to efficiency increases. Texas has the potential to generate 22,787 TWh/year, more than any other state, from 7.743 TW of concentrated solar power plants, using 34% of Texas, and 131.2 TWh/year from 97.8 GW of rooftop photovoltaic panels, 34.6% of the electricity used in the state in 2013. The 1,310-megawatt Samson Solar farm is under construction in northeastern Texas.

Texas electricity consumption in 2010 was 358.458 TWh, more than any other state, and 9.5% of the US total.

See also

Wind power in Texas
Solar power in the United States
Renewable energy in the United States

References

External links

Solar Energy Systems Dallas County 
Texas Solar Energy Society
Solar maps: NREL annual and monthly, ERCOT1, ERCOT2, US installations

Energy in Texas
Texas
Solar power in Texas